Carlo Battel (born 6 May 1972) is an Italian ski mountaineer.

Battel was born in Bolzano Novarese. He started ski mountaineering in 1993 and competed first in the Trofeo Cemin race in the same year. He was member of the national team after 2002.

Selected results 
 2000:
 3rd, Sellaronda Skimarathon (together with Franco Nicolini)
 2002:
 1st, Italian Championship
 1st, Sellaronda Skimarathon (together with Fabio Meraldi)
 3rd, World Championship single race
 2003:
 9th, European Championship team race (together with Jean Pellissier)
 2004:
 2nd, World Championship team race (together with Jean Pellissier)
 2nd, World Championship relay race (together with Graziano Boscacci, Martin Riz and Guido Giacomelli)
 2005:
 1st, Dolomiti Cup team (together with Mirco Mezzanotte)
 5th, European Championship team race (together with Jean Pellissier)
 2006:
 6th, World Championship team race (together with Jean Pellissier)

Pierra Menta 

 2001: 5th, together with Omar Obrandi
 2004: 4th, together with Jean Pellissier

Trofeo Mezzalama 

 1999: 7th, together with Adriano Greco and Bruno Zen
 2001: 3rd, together with Franco Nicolini and Enrico Pedrini

References

External links 
 Carlo Battel at SkiMountaineering.org.

1972 births
Living people
Sportspeople from the Province of Novara
Italian male ski mountaineers